Yoosuf Shafeeu  also known as Eupe (20 October 1975) is a Maldivian film actor, editor, writer, and director. One of the most successful filmmakers and actors in Maldivian Cinema, Shafeeu is the recipient of a number of awards, including eight Gaumee Film Awards, and a Maldives Film Award; ; holding the record of collecting maximum Gaumee Film Award for Best Actor. In 2003, the Government of Maldives honoured him with the National Award of Recognition.

Shafeeu made his career debut Amjad Ibrahim for his commercially successful comedy drama film Qurbaani (1999) followed by Hussain Adil's college romance Hiyy Halaaku, an unofficial remake of Kuch Kuch Hota Hai (1998). Despite receiving criticism for his performances in Amjad Ibrahim's horror films; Sandhuravirey (2002), Dhonkamana (2003) and first Maldivian sequel Sandhuravirey 2 (2004), Shafeeu was met with critical and commercial success with Fathimath Nahula-directed Naaummeedhu (2000), Loabi Nuvevununama (2002) and Kalaayaanulaa (2003). His performance as a confused husband in Kalaayaanulaa, a vulnerable father diagnosed with cancer in Fathimath Nahula's Zuleykha (2005) and a short tempered husband in the Abdul Faththaah's critically acclaimed Vehey Vaarey Therein (2003) resulted in three Gaumee Film Award nominations for Best Actor, ultimately winning it for the latter.

Shafeeu defended the trophy in the following ceremony with his performance as a conflicted husband Ahmed Nimal's romantic film Vaaloabi Engeynama (2006) while being nominated in the same category for the horror film, Hukuru Vileyrey (2006). In 2015, he created records by holding maximum trophies for Gaumee Film Award for Best Actor by winning the award for the third consecutive ceremony with Moomin Fuad's suspense thriller Happy Birthday (2009), among his other nominations; Fathimath Nahula's romantic drama film, Yoosuf (2008) and his own direction Veeraana (2010). From the year 2009 onward, majority of films starring Shafeeu were written and directed by himself, including films like Hiyy Rohvaanulaa (2009), 01 January (2009), Mendhamuge Evaguthu (2010), Loaiybahtakaa (2009), Insaaf where the last two mentioned films garnered him two Maldives Film Awards nominations for Best Director.

He was later noted for breaking his image as a romantic lover and experimenting with different genres. In 2013 Shafeeu featured in Ali Shifau-directed horror film Fathis Handhuvaruge Feshun 3D; first Maldivian 3D film and prequel where played the iconic role of Jinaa, which mainly received criticism. He then committed with his suspense thriller films; 24 Gadi Iru (2014) and Dhevansoora (2018), followed by his comedy films, Baiveriyaa (2016), Naughty 40 (2017) and the first Maldivian horror comedy film 40+ (2019).

Career

1999–05: Early releases
In 1999, while working at Paradise Island Resort, a crew of Television Maldives noticed him and offered to star in a video single. As persuaded by cinematographer Shiyaz, he featured in the video song "Dhiri Huri Furaana Dhaathee" alongside Jamsheedha Ahmed which became a hit among audience. Afterwards, he moved back to the resort and focused on his career there until he was spotted by director Amjad Ibrahim who signed him a role in his comedy drama film Qurbaani starring opposite Mariyam Nisha and Hussain Sobah. The film was a financially successful project and was declared a Mega-Hit at the end of its run at cinema. With regards to his fondness for the industry, he resigned from his post at the resort and joined the Motion Pictures studio.

Apart from Arifa Ibrahim-directed Saahibaa (2000), Shafeeu portrayed a college student in Hussain Adil's romance Hiyy Halaaku in 2000, in which he was involved in a love triangle along with Niuma Mohamed and Sheela Najeeb. The plot combines two love triangles set years apart. The first half covers friends on a college campus, while the second tells the story of a widower's young daughter who tries to reunite her dad with his old friend. The film was an unofficial remake of Karan Johar's romantic drama film Kuch Kuch Hota Hai (1998) starring Shah Rukh Khan, Kajol and Rani Mukerji in the lead role. He next starred alongside Mariyam Nazima and Ali Seezan as the single father who sacrifices his love for the sake of his handicapped friend, in Mohamed Rasheed's Hithu Vindhu (2000).

Amjad Ibrahim-directed Ainbehge Loabi Firiehge Vaajib starring Shafeeu, Jamsheedha Ahmed, Arifa Ibrahim and Niuma Mohamed was released in the same year. The film revolves around a woman who has been mistreated by her step-mother and forced into a marriage she disapproves. Shafeeu played dual role in the film; Hazaar, a hideous man whose first wife had extra-marital affair while seeking affection from his second marriage, and Shafiu, the guy whom Hazaar's second wife falls for. He starred as Dr. Ahmed Shifan, a sober longing for his unrequited love in Fathimath Nahula's drama film Naaummeedhu (2000) which depicts the story of a happily married couple whose life is shattered into pieces when they unintentionally invite a seductive woman into their life. The film receiving favorable reviews from critics was able to screen twenty eight houseful shows at Olympus Cinema, making it the highest grossing Maldivian film of the year. Besides, Shafeeu played the comprehensive husband opposite Mariyam Nisha in Amjad Ibrahim's comedy drama film, Majubooru Loabi (2000).

He next starred alongside Sheela Najeeb, Jamsheedha Ahmed, Mohamed Shavin and Ibrahim Giyas in Amjad Ibrahim-directed Aaah (2001) which revolves around two siblings involved in family business and the downfall of the younger brother's love life when he discovers his fiancé is already married to an abusive husband. In 2002, Shafeeu had three film releases whereas he first featured alongside Mariyam Nisha, Mariyam Nazima, Moosa Zakariyya and Ahmed Shimau in Shimau-directed family drama film Loabi Nuvevununama. Written by Fathimath Nahula, the story narrates the journey of a handicapped man who has been betrayed in love and unknowingly marries his brother's love interest. The film was a critical and commercial success. He next worked with Amjad Ibrahim for two projects; his horror film Sandhuravirey (2002) which narrates the story of a female jinn aiming to win the heart of a human being and his drama film opposite Sheela Najeeb, Kahvalhah Dhaandhen. Featuring Shafeeu and Mariyam Nisha in lead roles, the former received poor reviews from critics.

Shafeeu next collaborated with Amjad Ibrahim for his romantic horror film Dhonkamana (2003) which depicts the romantic relationship between a young man (played by Shafeeu) and an old woman (played by Fauziyya Hassan). Featuring Hassan, Sheela Najeeb, Niuma Mohamed, Sheereen Abdul Wahid, Amira Ismail and Aminath Rasheedha, the film received mainly negative reviews from critics though its inclusion of the theme portraying the relationship between a couple with a large age group was appraised. His most successful release of the year was Fathimath Nahula's romantic film Kalaayaanulaa (2003) which follows a happily married couple (played by Shafeeu and Aishath Shiranee) where the husband decided to marry his childhood best friend (played by Niuma Mohamed) when his wife fails to sexually please him. The film received widespread critical acclaim for its performances and was declared to be year's highest grossing Maldivian film release. Shafeeu's portrayal of the contrast husband, garnered him a Gaumee Film Award nomination as the Best Actor. Shafeeu received his first Gaumee Film Award as the Best Actor for his "authentic" performance as the negligent and short tempered husband who continues an extramarital affair with his ex-lover in Abdul Faththaah's critically praised romantic film Vehey Vaarey Therein (2003). Featuring Jamsheedha Ahmed, Khadheeja Ibrahim Didi, Mohamed Shavin, Amira Ismail and Aminath Rasheedha in crucial roles, the film narrates the story of unrequited love, and proved to be one of the highest-grossing Maldivian films of the year.

Shafeeu reprised his role as Dhiyash in Amjad Ibrahim's next directorial venture Sandhuravirey 2 (2004) which was a sequel to his 2002 horror film Sandhuravirey. Starring additional cast including Niuma Mohamed, Zeenath Abbas, Mohamed Shavin and Sheereen Abdul Wahid, Shafeeu also played the role of an established film actor, Nail, the son of Dhiyash and Shafqa who has been harassed by the jinn; his half sister. Similar to its prequel, the film received negative response from critics. The following year, Edhathuru was released which appears Mohamed Shavin, Sheereen Abdul Wahid, Ali Ahmed, Lufshan Shakeeb, Fathmath Neelam, Nadhiya Hassan, Ibrahim Sobah and Yoosuf Solih as eight friends who go on a picnic to a haunted uninhabited island and their battle for survival. The film garnered critical appreciation specially for its sound effect and was a commercial success.

His last release of the year was another collaboration with Fathimath Nahula in the critically appreciated and commercially prosperous project, a romantic drama film Zuleykha (2005) which narrates the journey of a nine years old girl seeking the lost love of her mother. Featuring an ensemble cast including Sheela Najeeb, Mariyam Nisha, Ali Seezan, Mohamed Manik and Mariyam Enash Sinan, Shafeeu played the role of a vulnerable father who has been diagnosed with the last stage of cancer which fetched him a Gaumee Film Award nomination as the Best Actor while winning the Miadhu Crystal Award for Best Actor. Thirty three housefull shows of the film were screened at the cinema making it the highest grossing Maldivian release of the year.

2006–09: Awards and recognition
Shafeeu worked in another horror film, Hukuru Vileyrey (2006), co-directed by Aishath Rishmy and Aminath Rasheedha which was based on a novel published by Ibrahim Waheed on Haveeru Daily in 2003. The film was a critical and commercial success while being considered as "one of the few acceptable horror film the Maldivian Film Industry has ever produced". It was later released as 15 episodes television series with inclusion of several clips that were edited off while released in theatre. His performance as an aspiring author who becomes enthralled by an evil spirit received a Gaumee Film Award nomination for Best Actor. His next release, Ahmed Nimal's romantic film Vaaloabi Engeynama (2006), starred alongside Mariyam Afeefa, Fathimath Fareela and Fauziyya Hassan was a critical and commercial success, considered to be the most successful Maldivian release of the year. His performance as a conflicted husband struggling to convey equal affection towards his two wives won him his second Gaumee Film Award as the Best Actor.

In 2008, Shafeeu appeared in Fathimath Nahula's romantic drama film, Yoosuf which depicts the story of a deaf and mute man (played by Shafeeu) who has been mistreated by a wealthy family mocking his disability. Featuring an ensemble cast including Niuma Mohamed, Sheela Najeeb, Mohamed Manik, Ahmed Nimal, Fauziyya Hassan, Ravee Farooq, Zeenath Abbas and Ahmed Lais Asim, the film is considered to include most prominent faces in a Maldivian film. Shafeeu considered his role in the film to be the most challenging role he has portrayed so far in his career. The film received widespread critical acclaim and was attained a blockbuster status at box office. A total of forty five housefull shows were screened at Olympus Cinema before the film was leaked online, however the producers were able to screen five more shows at the cinema making it one of the Maldivian all-time highest-grossing movies. The film was Maldivian official entry at 2009 SAARC Film Festivals and holds the privilege of being the opening movie of the festival. His performance earned him a Gaumee Film Awards nomination as Best Actor and a Maldives Film Award nomination in the same category. His next directorial venture was the romantic drama film Soora (2008), directed along with Fathimath Nahula. The film was originally released as a television series to positive response.

Shafeeu had six film releases in 2009. His first role was in Amjad Ibrahim's romantic horror film Udhabaani, where Shafeeu was cast as the boyfriend of a school student (played by Amira Ismail) who has been harassed by a supernatural force. Upon release, the film received mixed reviews from critics although it performed well at the box office, making it Ibrahim's most successful venture. He then played the tender husband who raped his wife's younger sister, in Ahmed Nimal-directed family drama film E Dharifulhu (2009) featuring an ensemble cast including Niuma Mohamed, Mohamed Manik, Sheela Najeeb and Ahmed Nimal. At 1st Maldives Film Awards, Shafeeu received his third nomination as Best Actor for his performance in the film. He next appeared in Moomin Fuad's suspense thriller Happy Birthday which narrates the story of a simple man who receives a call on his birthday informing that his wife and son have been kidnapped, only to be returned for a ransom. Shafeeu played the role of Asif, a straightforward man who had an unfortunate birthday. A total of five shows with little occupancy were screened at the cinema, declaring the film a commercial failure, despite the positive response from the critics. Winning five Gaumee Film Awards and twelve Maldives Film Awards, the film was also screened at the Venice Film Festival. For his performance in the film, Shafeeu was bestowed with the Best Actor award at 6th Gaumee Film Awards and 1st Maldives Film Awards ceremony.

The same year, he wrote, directed and starred in the drama film Hiyy Rohvaanulaa which features Niuma Mohamed, Abdulla Muaz and Nadhiya Hassan alongside him. The film follows a blind man who regains his eyesight but decides to fake his blindness to discover her wife's affair with another man. Shafeeu played the role of Shiyan, the senior supervisor of school who lost his purpose in his life due to his blindness. The film received favorable reviews from critics and was a commercial success. Another release of the year, Loaiybahtakaa (2009), written and directed by Shafeeu stars him as an orphan who surprisingly discovers his identity. The romantic drama, co-starring Sheela Najeeb, Fathimath Fareela and Mohamed Faisal, tells the story of unrequited love, and proved to be a commercial success. The film along with his direction garnered him a nomination at 1st Maldives Film Awards ceremony. His fifth and last release of the year was a psychological thriller 01 January (2009) which was directed by him and co-starring Yoosuf Zuhuree, Hamdhan Farooq and Mohamed Rifshan. In the film, he played a psycho who scares two of his tenants with complicated attitude and instructions.

2010–12: Expansion into film production
Shafeeu's first release of 2010 was Ali Shifau-directed family drama Dhin Veynuge Hithaamaigaa where he played the role of Nashid, who was victimised through a family vengeance by his cousin brother. The film showcases discrimination against the islanders, family revenge and fatherhood responsibilities. The film and his performance received positive response from critics. The film was believed to be a "huge improvement" over the recent Maldivian films. Being able to screen fifteen housefull shows of the film, it was declared to be a commercial success. He next starred opposite Sheela Najeeb and Mohamed Manik in Ahmed Nimal's horror film Zalzalaa En'buri Aun (2010). It was a spin-off to Aslam Rasheed's horror classic film Zalzalaa (2000) starring Ibrahim Wisan, Ali Shameel and Niuma Mohamed. The film revolves around a mariage blanc, a murder of husband by his wife with secret lover and avenging of his death from everyone involved in the crime. He played the role of Ahmed Hamza, an asexual husband who has been murdered by his wife, taking vengeance of his death possessed by a spirit. The film received mixed response from critics and it did average business at box office.

Later in 2010, Shafeeu appeared alongside Niuma Mohamed and Amira Ismail in Veeraana, a drama film that deals with child sexual abuse. Directed by Shafeeu himself, he played the role of Shahin, a father who becomes aware of the fact his daughter being sexually assaulted by her step-uncle. The film received mixed to positive reviews from critics; praising the writer and director for touching a condemnatory topic though criticing its "over-the-top melodrama". His performance was perceived to be on a "satisfactory" level. Having a strong buzz prior its release, the film was proved to be a commercial success. For the film, he received a nomination for the Best Actor category at 2nd Maldives Film Awards ceremony, while he was nominated for Best Editing at 6th Gaumee Film Awards. He next appeared in Niuma Mohamed's directorial debut drama film Niuma (2010) alongside an ensemble cast including Mohamed, Sheela Najeeb, Mohamed Manik, Ahmed Nimal, Aminath Rasheedha and Abdulla Muaz. He played the role of a brother who finally stood beside his sister who had been sexually abused by her father and brother. Upon release, the film was met with widespread critical acclaim specifically complimenting the performance of actors and its dialogues. Being able to screen over thirty housefull shows of the film, it was declared a Mega-Hit at box office, and the highest grossing Maldivian release of the year. He received a nomination in Best Choreography for the song "Hiyy Dhevijjey" at the 6th Gaumee Film Awards. This was followed by a horror film, Mendhamuge Evaguthu (2010) co-written and co-directed by him alongside Amjad Ibrahim. It follows a group of ten friends watching a horror film which is being influenced by a narration in it.

The last release of year featured Shafeeu in the drama film Heyonuvaane (2010)-directed by Shafeeu, opposite Sheela Najeeb and Fathimath Fareela. The story revolves around a male who is victimised of domestic abuse. He played the role of an impotent husband who has been discriminated and abused by her ferocious wife. The film received majorly negative reviews from critics though her performance was singularly commended. Ahmed Naif from Sun commended his acting though he was displeased with his direction. "The use of flashbacks and character introduction was lame. Neither the order of scenes nor its transactions are worth being mentioned". Twenty two housefull shows of the film were screened at cinema, declaring it a Mega-Hit and second highest grossing Maldivian release of the year.

Shafeeu began 2011 with Amjad Ibrahim's suspense thriller film Hafaraaiy alongside Ali Shameel, Mariyam Shakeela, Amira Ismail and Fathimath Fareela, which was a critical and commercial failure. Based on a real incidence, the film narrates a story of a cannibal woman who is addicted to eats human flesh, how she victimised the inhabitants with her face covered in a veil. The film received criticism for its "fragile" plot, "unnecessary" characters though its makeup was appreciated. Ahmed Naif from Sun wrote: "neither scientifically nor psychologically, it's been proven in the film how a chicken addict turns to be a cannibal. The film slides from a suspense thriller to a comedy for its inclusion of inconceivable details". He next appeared in the family drama E Bappa (2011) which was directed by himself, featuring an ensemble cast including Hassan Manik, Mohamed Manik, Sheela Najeeb, Amira Ismail, Lufshan Shakeeb, Mariyam Shakeela and Fathimath Fareela. A film about fatherhood and how he has been treated by his family, received negative reviews for its "typical stereotype style" and was a box office failure. A series of flop was continued with Hamid Ali's Laelaa starring Amira Ismail and Fathimath Azifa opposite him.

Last release of the year featured Shafeeu as a police officer Aiman in his action drama film Insaaf (2011). The film revolves around the disputes between two districts of an island. Upon release, the film received mixed to positive reviews from critics. Ahmed Nadheem from Haveeru criticised the work of Shafeeu in film: "It is evident Shafeeu has put so much effort into developing the characters of the film, but he forgot to develop his own character. Shafeeu proved his acting skill in other film, but this not his caliber. His work behind the camera is disappointing as much as his performance in the film". Despite the negative reviews, he received a nomination for Best Supporting Actor and Best Director at 2nd Maldives Film Awards.

2013–2017: Further production ventures

In 2013, Shafeeu featured in Ali Shifau-directed horror film Fathis Handhuvaruge Feshun 3D which serves as a prequel to Fathis Handhuvaru (1997) starring Reeko Moosa Manik and Niuma Mohamed in lead roles. It was based on a story by Ibrahim Waheed, Jinaa: Fathis Handhuvaruge Feshun (2009), which itself is a prequel to the story Fathishandhuvaru (1996) written by himself which was later adapted to a film by same name in 1997. The film was marketed as being the first 3D release for a Maldivian film and the first release derived from spin-off. He played the role of Jinaa, a ghost that seeks revenge from humans for killing its wife. Upon release the film received generally negative reviews from critics. Ahmed Nadheem from Haveeru Daily wrote: "As we hear the name Jinaa, there comes the influence of Reeko Moosa Manik, where Shafeeu pales in comparison. The lack of excitement in his performance, a fear arises where the readers and viewers might dislike the classic character. Shafeeu failed to reach the anticipation Manik has brought to the character in its earlier release". Despite the negative reviews, at the 7th Gaumee Film Awards he was nominated in the Best Actor award category for his performance in the film.

The following year he starred opposite Fathimath Azifa in the suspense thriller film 24 Gadi Iru (2014) which was co-directed by him and Mohamed Rasheed. The film focuses on a romantic relationship between a girl diagnosed with mental illness and her psychiatrist. Production of the film began in 2010, though it was theatrically released four years later. His role as Visham, a psychiatrist and the film received mixed reviews from critics.

In 2016, Shafeeu played the role of Mifu, a member of a group of friends who become trapped in a haunted house, in Fathimath Nahula's horror film 4426. Upon release, the film received mostly positive reviews from critics. Ahmed Nadheem of Avas labelled the film as a "masterpiece" and noted Shafeeu's performance to be "good". With twenty-five back-to-back housefull shows being screened, 4426 was declared as the highest grossing Maldivian film of the year. The same year, he featured alongside Niuma Mohamed in Ibrahim Wisan's debut direction Vee Beyvafa which was shot in 2011. The film received a negative response from critics where Ahmed Adhushan of Mihaaru concluded his review calling the film "a step backward" in the progress of cinema. Baiveriyaa (2016), a comedy film featuring an ensemble cast written, edited and directed by Shafeeu was his third and final release of the year. The film revolves around an aspiring actress who flees from her family to pursue a career in the industry and the suspicions and confusions that arise. Upon release the film was positively received by critics. Nazim Hassan of Avas applauded the comic timing of the characters and picked the heated arguments between Shafeeu and Najeeb as the highlights of the film. He wrote: "Shafeeu proved he has comical sense though its a genre he has not explored before". The film emerged as one of the highest grossing Maldivian films of the year.

Shafeeu's first release of 2017 featured him alongside an ensemble cast including Mohamed Manik, Ahmed Saeed and Ali Seezan, Fathimath Azifa and Ali Azim in the romantic comedy film Naughty 40 which was directed by himself. The film revolves around three friends, Ashwanee, Ahsan and Ajwad (Played by Shafeeu, Saeed and Manik respectively) who are single and having a youthful outlook, in spite of being in their forties. Azifa played the role of Taniya, the beguiling lady signed up by her aunt to seduce and take down their rival businessman in the island, Jawad. The film met with both critical and commercial success, emerging as one of the highest grossing Maldivian films of 2017. He was next seen alongside Fathimath Azifa and Jadhulla Ismail in the Mohamed Aboobakuru-directed Neydhen Vakivaakah, which was a critical and commercial failure.

2018–present: Experiment with different genres
2018 was a dull year for Maldivian film-industry with regards to 2018 Maldivian presidential election, hence only one film of Shafeeu was released during the year; a suspense thriller film Dhevansoora (2018) written and directed by Shafeeu. The film marks Shafeeu's thirtieth direction and features an ensemble cast of twenty-one actors. Revolving around a murder investigating, Shafeeu played a character suffering from dissociative identity disorder and the accused murderer. The film received positive reviews from critics and was considered a "norm-breaker" of the Maldivian cinema. Ahmed Hameed Adam reviewing from VNews considered Shafeeu's performance as the "highlight of the film"; "Watch out for the little nuisance he brought into his character during the investigation scenes". Ismail Nail Rasheed from Raajje.mv wrote: "Shafeeu had to portray three different roles in the film and he lived in each character to its fullest". He then starred in the first Maldivian web-series, a romantic drama by Fathimath Nahula, Huvaa. The series consisting of sixty episodes and streamed through the digital platform Baiskoafu, centers around a happy and radiant family which breaks into despairing pieces after a tragic incident that led to an unaccountable loss. The series and his performance as a caring husband and a responsible father who was stabbed and murdered by mistake were positively received.

Shafeeu's first release of 2019 was the Moomin Fuad-directed psychological horror thriller Nivairoalhi (2019) which marks Niuma Mohamed's last onscreen film. 
Starring opposite Mohamed and Ahmed Asim, the film received majorly positive reviews from critics; Aishath Maaha of Dho? favored the performance of the lead actors and mentioned the "neat arrangement" of its screenplay though pointed out its "weak ending" to be unsatisfactory. Praising his performance as businessman and the husband of a patient suffering from depression, Maaha wrote: "The less said about Shafeeu's performance, the better. His performance is on a par with the standards he, himself has created". This was followed by his horror comedy film 40+ (2019), a sequel to 2017 released comedy film Naughty 40 which was well received both critically and commercially. He next directed and starred in Nafrathuvumun (2019), played alongside Mariyam Azza, Ali Azim and Ahmed Easa revolves around a guesthouse, the only source of income for a woman who is convinced by several men to sell the property. Mariyam Waheedha from Miadhu praised his "simple yet convincing" performance as an obliging friend. Ifraz Ali from Dho? chose the film among the best five films released during the year and noted: "The director has chosen a different yet engaging concept, but fails to bring the best from actors". He then directed a romantic horror film Dhauvath (2019), which follows a happily married couple who goes on a honeymoon trip and the paranormal activities they experience due to black-magic. Mariyam Waheedha from Miadhu noted that Shafeeu "succeeds in exploring the witchcraft and black magic while perfectly conveying the moral message to audience and extracting the most from the actors". However, Ifraz Ali from Dho? chose the film among the worst five films released during the year while pointing out its resemblance with Turkey's Sijjin film series.

Media image
In 2011, Shafeeu was selected in the top five as the "Most Entertaining Actor" in the SunFM Awards 2010, an award night ceremony initiated by Sun Media Group to honour the most recognized personalities in different fields, during the previous year.  In 2018, he was ranked in the second position from Dho?'s list of Top Ten Actor of Maldives.

Filmography

Feature film

Television

Short film

Other work

Accolades

References

External links
 

Maldivian male film actors
Living people
Maldivian film directors
1975 births
People from Malé